Sky Street is an album by guitarist Kenny Burrell recorded in 1975 and released on the Fantasy Records label in 1976. The album was released on CD combined with Stormy Monday (Fantasy, 1978) as Stormy Monday Blues in 2001.

Reception

Allmusic awarded the album 4 stars stating "This is the type of jazz that crossed over onto albums by rock bands like Steely Dan in the mid-'70s".

Track listing 
All compositions by Jerome Richardson except where noted
 "Three Thousand Miles Back Home" - 7:43     
 "Kim-Den Strut" - 10:15     
 "Habiba" (Kirk Lightsey) - 8:22     
 "Quiet Lady" (Thad Jones) - 7:23

Personnel 
Kenny Burrell - guitar
Jerome Richardson - tenor saxophone, soprano saxophone, flute
Kirk Lightsey - piano, electric piano
Stanley Gilbert - bass
Eddie Marshall - drums

References 

Kenny Burrell albums
1976 albums
Fantasy Records albums